Joseph Lee Estes (born October 8, 2001) is an American professional baseball pitcher in the Oakland Athletics organization.

Amateur career 
Estes attended Paraclete High School in Lancaster, California. As a freshman in 2016, he compiled a 1.05 ERA, and as a sophomore, he went 9–1 with a 0.31 ERA over ninety innings. In 2019, as a senior, he went 8–0 with a 0.91 ERA and 124 strikeouts. He was selected by the Atlanta Braves in the 16th round of the 2019 Major League Baseball draft. He signed, forgoing his commitment to play college baseball at Long Beach State University.

Professional career 
Estes made his professional debut with the Rookie-level Gulf Coast League Braves with whom he gave up nine earned runs over ten innings. He did not play a game in 2020 after the minor league season was cancelled due to the COVID-19 pandemic. Estes spent the 2021 season with the Augusta GreenJackets of the Low-A East, starting twenty games and pitching to a 3–6 record, a 2.91 ERA, and 127 strikeouts over 99 innings. His .181 batting average against was ninth in the minor leagues. He was named the league's Pitcher of the Week twice during the season, and was named the league's Pitcher of the Year following the season's end.

On March 14, 2022, the Braves traded Estes, Shea Langeliers, Ryan Cusick, and Cristian Pache to the Oakland Athletics in exchange for Matt Olson. He was assigned to the Lansing Lugnuts of the High-A Midwest League for the 2022 season. Over twenty starts, he went 3-7 with a 4.55 ERA and 92 strikeouts over 91 innings.

References

External links 

Minor league baseball players
2001 births
Living people
Baseball pitchers
Baseball players from California
Gulf Coast Braves players
Augusta GreenJackets players
Lansing Lugnuts players